JDW may refer to:
 Jane's Defence Weekly, a British magazine
 James D. Watson (born 1928), American molecular biologist
John David Washington (born 1984), American actor and former football running back
 Wetherspoons, a pub chain